Bosphorus Cup may refer to:
Bosphorus Cup (figure skating), a figure skating competition
International Bosphorus Cup, a horse race